The 2016–17 season of the NOFV-Oberliga was the ninth season of the league at tier five (V) in the German football league system and the 27th overall. The league is split into northern and southern divisions.

North
The 2016–17 season of the NOFV-Oberliga Nord saw four new clubs in the league. VSG Altglienicke, SV Grün-Weiß Brieselang and FC Mecklenburg Schwerin were all promoted from the Verbandsligas while FSV Optik Rathenow was relegated from the Regionalliga Nordost.

Top goalscorers

South
The 2016–17 season of the NOFV-Oberliga Süd saw four new clubs in the league.  BSG Chemie Leipzig and SV Merseburg 99 were promoted from the Landesligas or Verbandsligas while VfB Germania Halberstadt was relegated from the Regionalliga Nordost and Brandenburger SC Süd 05 moved from the northern division.

Top goalscorers

Promotion round to the Regionalliga
The two second-placed teams in the NOFV-Oberliga played each other for one more spot in the Regionalliga next season:

References

External links 
 NOFV-Oberliga Nord at Fupa.net 
 NOFV-Oberliga Süd at Fupa.net 

NOFV-Oberliga seasons
Nofv